Mobarakeh Rural District is in the Central District of Bafq County, Yazd province, Iran. At the National Census of 2006, its population was 3,869 in 1,075 households. There were 4,258 inhabitants in 1,174 households at the following census of 2011. At the most recent census of 2016, the population of the rural district was 3,602 in 1,045 households. The largest of its 118 villages was Mobarakeh, with 3,301 people.

References 

Bafq County

Rural Districts of Yazd Province

Populated places in Yazd Province

Populated places in Bafq County